Francis MacNamara (ca. 1810 - 28 August 1861), known as  Frank the Poet, was an Irish writer, a convict, transported to the Colony of New South Wales, Australia from Cashel, County Tipperary, Ireland, he composed improvised verse expressing the convict's point of view.

Transportation

MacNamara in 1832 was convicted of larceny, and sentenced to seven years transportation to Australia. He often absconded and received an extended sentence as well as floggings and other punishments, and was finally sent to the dreaded Port Arthur in Van Diemen's Land. He received a ticket of leave in 1847 and his freedom in 1849, after which there is little record of his life. His verse suggests he was an educated person with strong political convictions.

Writings

He versified from the start of his convict career: treating the court to an extempore epigram about being sent to Botany Bay, and composing a mock-heroic poem about his case during the voyage out. Except for one longer poem, his verse was passed among convicts by word of mouth. Some of his ballads and epigrams survive in manuscript form in the Mitchell Library, Sydney, having been written down in the late nineteenth century. The popular ballad Moreton Bay or A Convict's Lament, often sung in Australian primary schools, has been attributed to Frank the Poet. His published work, A Convict's Tour to Hell was written in October 1839 while he worked as a shepherd at Stroud.

In A Convict's Tour to Hell Frank dies during captivity and, assuming there is no place for him in heaven, heads downwards, setting up camp by the River Styx, until Charon offers him a free fare on account of his reputation. Not liking the look of Hell, Frank first seeks admission to Purgatory but Pope Pius VII refuses him admittance, explaining that Limbo was invented by priests and popes for their own exclusive use. He then tries Hell, where he sees many of his former jailers, including the brutal Captain Logan, as well as Governor Darling and Captain Cook (condemned for discovering New South Wales) – before the Devil sends him to join the rest of the poor and downtrodden in Heaven, as Hell was made just for the 'Grandees of the Land'. Saint Peter admits him to Heaven on the say-so of several residents, such as Bold Jack Donahue (a convict who turned bushranger).

Death and legacy
Francis MacNamara died in Mudgee on 28 August 1861. News of his death was carried in three newspapers in New South Wales, the Western Post on 31 August, the Empire on 4 September and the Maitland Mercury on 7 September.

On 5 August 2012 ABC Radio National broadcast "Frank the Poet - A Convict's Tour to Hell".

See also
List of convicts transported to Australia

References

Reece, B., ‘Frank the Poet’ in B. Reece (ed), Exiles from Erin (Lond, 1991).

History of New South Wales
History of Tasmania
Convicts transported to Australia
Australian male poets
1810s births
1861 deaths
19th-century Australian poets
People from Cashel, County Tipperary
Prison writings
19th-century male writers